The  Medea statue  is a monument to Medea, a Colchian Princess of the Greek mythology erected in Batumi, Georgia. 

It was unveiled by the President of Georgia, Mikheil Saakashvili, on 6 July 2007.

See also
 Colchis
 History of Georgia (country)
 Golden Fleece
 Medea
 Argonauts

References

2007 establishments in Georgia (country)
2007 sculptures
Buildings and structures in Batumi
Monuments and memorials in Georgia (country)
Monuments and memorials to women
Sculpture of Georgia (country)
Works about Medea
Sculptures of classical mythology